Parategeticula elephantipella is a moth of the family Prodoxidae. It is found on the eastern slopes of the Sierra Madre Oriental in Veracruz, Mexico.

The wingspan is 21–23 mm for males and 20.5-26.5 mm for females.

The larvae feed on Yucca elephantipes. Young larvae bore into the young fruit of their host plant, where they feed on developing seeds. Fully grown larvae are dull red. They exit the fruit and dig into loose soil, where it creates a solid silk cocoon covered with soil particles.

Etymology
The species name is derived from the host plant, Yucca elephantipes.

References

Moths described in 2000
Prodoxidae
Lepidoptera of Mexico
Endemic insects of Mexico
Fauna of the Sierra Madre Oriental